Brachyloma saxicola is a small shrub in the family Ericaceae.

Distribution 
The Brachyloma saxicola is native to New South Wales, Australia.

References

Epacridoideae
Flora of New South Wales